Badminton events for the 1967 Southeast Asian Peninsular Games were held at Bangkok, Thailand between 9 to 16 December 1967. Host Thailand won gold medals in three disciplines while Malaysia stood second in the tally by winning two gold medals.

Medalists

Semifinal results

Final results

Medal table

References

External links 
HISTORY OF THE SEA GAMES, olympic.org.my

1967
1967 in badminton
1967 in Thai sport
Badminton tournaments in Thailand
Sports competitions in Bangkok